Constantin Koszka (17 September 1939 – 2000) was a Romanian footballer. He competed in the men's tournament at the 1964 Summer Olympics.

Notes

References

External links

1939 births
2000 deaths
Romanian footballers
Romania international footballers
Olympic footballers of Romania
Footballers at the 1964 Summer Olympics
FC UTA Arad players
FC Rapid București players
FC Steaua București players
FCV Farul Constanța players
CS Portul Constanța players
Liga I players
Liga II players
Sportspeople from Arad, Romania
Association football midfielders